The Gary Railway  is owned and operated by Transtar, Inc., a subsidiary of the United States Steel Corporation. It currently runs along 63 miles of yard track throughout Gary, Indiana as a class III switching carrier for local steel supply.  The Gary Railway is the successor to the Elgin, Joliet and Eastern Railway after Canadian National Railway purchased the majority of the former EJE and finalized the deal on February 1 2009.

Currently the Gary Railway's primary customer is the U.S. Steel works in Gary, Indiana. However, it also serves four additional steel processing groups: ArcelorMittal USA, Tube City IMS, Brandenburg Industrial, and the Levy Company.  The railway interchanges with Canadian National at Gary as well as several other Class I rail carriers connected along the lines of the former Elgin, Joliet and Eastern Railway.

References

External links
Gary Railway

Indiana railroads
Companies based in Indiana
Transportation in Gary, Indiana
U.S. Steel